The Vilnian Baroque or the School of Vilnius Baroque is a name of late Baroque architecture style in church architecture of the Grand Duchy of Lithuania and on territories covered by the Union of Brest.

The architect Johann Christoph Glaubitz is considered to be one of the founders of Vilnian Baroque. Working on restoration of churches in Vilnius, he was often inspired by contemporary buildings of Austria and Bavaria. Vilnian Baroque was most popular among the Uniates which gave the style its second name ‘Uniate Baroque’. Another famous architect Thomas Zebrowski also designed and supervised constructions of Vilnian Baroque churches in Lithuania and Belarus.

Vilnian Baroque is characterized by upward striving outlooks, two towers symmetry, overall lightness of shapes. In this regard the style is opposed to the so-called  that was widespread in the Grand Duchy of Lithuania in the late XVII — early XVIII centuries. Other features of the Vilnian Baroque include differently decorated compartments, undulation of cornices and walls, decorativeness in bright colors, and multi-colored marble and stucco altars in the interiors.

Monuments of Vilnian Baroque by country

Lithuania 

 Vilnius
 ;
 Church of St. Catherine;
 Church of St. Casimir;
 ;
 ;
 Church of the Discovery of the Holy Cross
 Church of Jesus the Redeemer;
 ;
 Church of St. Raphael the Archangel;
 Church of All Saints;
 Dominican Church of the Holy Spirit;
 Church of St. Johns;
 ;
 Church of St. Philip and St. Jacob;
 Orthodox Church of the Holy Spirit;
 Orthodox Church of St. Nicholas;
 ;
 Gates of the Monastery of the Holy Trinity;
 Church of St. Peter and St. Paul;
 Church of St. Theresa.

 Kaunas
 Church of St. Francis Xavier;
 Pažaislis Monastery;

 Kražiai
 .

Belarus 

 Saint Sophia Cathedral in Polotsk;
 ;
 Zhyrovichy Monastery;
 ;
 .

Ukraine 
 Pochayiv Lavra;
 Transfiguration Cathedral, Vinnytsia.
 Buchach Monastery.

Latvia 
 Basilica of the Assumption in Aglona;
 St Dominic's Church in Pasiene;
 Jesuit Church in Ilūkste.

References

Sources 

Catholic art by period
Baroque architecture in Lithuania
Grand Duchy of Lithuania